Frances Evelyn "Daisy" Greville, Countess of Warwick (née Maynard; 10 December 1861 – 26 July 1938) was a British socialite and philanthropist. Although embedded in late-Victorian British high society, she was also a campaigning socialist, supporting many schemes to aid the less well-off in education, housing, employment, and pay. She established colleges for the education of women in agriculture and market gardening, first in Reading, then in Studley. She established a needlework school and employment scheme in Essex as well as using her ancestral homes to host events and schemes for the benefit of her tenants and workers. Greville was a long-term confidant or mistress to the Prince of Wales, who later became King Edward VII.

She was said to be referenced in the popular music hall song "Daisy, Daisy", owing to her rather unorthodox conduct.

Family

Born at 27 Berkeley Square, London, she was the elder of two daughters of Colonel Charles Maynard and his second wife, Blanche FitzRoy. Blanche FitzRoy was descended from Charles II through his mistress Nell Gwyn via her mother, Jane Beauclerk, and Henry Fitzroy. Blanche FitzRoy was also descended from the Dukes of Grafton via her grandfather Rev. Henry Fitzroy, and through them from Charles II and his mistress Barbara Palmer. Blanche's maternal grandmother, Charlotte Ogilvie, was a daughter of the second marriage of Emily Lennox, one of the Lennox sisters, and through her was again a descendant of Charles II, and his French mistress, Louise de Keroualle. Blanche was only 18 when she gave birth to Frances, whilst Charles was aged 50. Frances would always be known as Daisy. The Maynards' younger daughter and Daisy's sister was named after her mother and was always known as Blanchie. Charles Maynard was the eldest son and heir apparent of Henry Maynard, 3rd Viscount Maynard. As Charles died three months before the Viscount, it was Daisy who inherited the Maynard estates in 1865, including her ancestral home of Easton Lodge in Little Easton, Essex. Two years after her father's death, her mother married 33-year-old Lord Rosslyn, a favourite courtier of Queen Victoria. They had five children, Daisy's half-sisters, including the noted Sybil Fane, Countess of Westmorland; Millicent Leveson-Gower, Duchess of Sutherland; and Lady Angela Forbes.

Marriage 

Frances Maynard was considered a possible wife for Queen Victoria's youngest son, Prince Leopold (later Duke of Albany). The Queen desired this and used Lord Beaconsfield to influence the Maynard family to this end. However, the match fell through, and by mutual choice, in 1881 Frances married Francis Greville, Lord Brooke, the eldest son and heir of George Greville, 4th Earl of Warwick, although her parents did not initially approve.

Lord Brooke succeeded to the earldom in 1893, and the family moved to Warwick Castle. Daisy's first child, and probably the only one fathered by her husband, was Leopold Guy (1882–1928), who later became the sixth Earl of Warwick. Marjorie Blanche (1884–1964), born three years after the marriage, was Daisy's second child. Daisy, in a 1923 conversation with Basil Dean, the husband of Mercy, stated that Marjorie was fathered by Lord Charles Beresford. The third, Charles Algernon (1885–1887), died aged 16 months, and may also have been fathered by Charles Beresford.

Daisy's fourth child was a son, Maynard (1898–1960), and the fifth, a daughter, Mercy (1904–1968). These were fathered by Joseph Frederick (Joe) Laycock, a millionaire bachelor with whom Daisy was infatuated despite his faithlessness to her. Mercy was fathered by Laycock after he had married Katherine Mary (Kitty), the Marchioness of Downshire, on 14 November 1902, after she had been divorced by Arthur Hill, 6th Marquess of Downshire, citing adultery with Laycock.

Personal life

Following Daisy's marriage, she became a celebrated hostess and socialite, often hosting or attending lavish parties and gatherings. She and her husband were members of the 'Marlborough House Set', headed by Albert Edward, Prince of Wales (the future Edward VII). Beginning in 1886, as was the unspoken 'code' for aristocrats of her set, she became involved in affairs with several powerful men, most notably the Prince of Wales.

Lady Warwick was a favourite of the Prince of Wales and entertained him and his entourage lavishly. As a royal favourite, others would 'prove their worth' by assisting those favourites. Cecil Rhodes made sure that her investments in Tanganyika Concessions were successful. Tanganyika Concessions Ltd was notorious for stock manipulation — during one period of a few days the price went from 2 pence to 13 pounds per share and then crashed.

Lady Warwick had a passionate affair with Lord Charles Beresford and was outraged to learn of Lady Charles Beresford's pregnancy during this time. Questioning Lord Charles's loyalty to her, she dispatched a letter to him over the matter. Daisy was unaware that Lord Charles had instructed his wife to open his mail whilst he was away on campaign and thus Lady Charles became aware of the affair.

The letter became a point of dispute and was the reason Daisy acquired the epithet "Babbling Brooke." Others who read the letter, including Charles's brother, Lord Marcus Beresford, agreed it "ought to have never seen the light of day". Lady Charles handed the letter to Sir George Lewis, 1st Baronet, a solicitor who acted for many society figures, for safekeeping. Lady Warwick attempted to pull rank and appealed to the Prince of Wales.

Arguably, the incident effectively cemented Lady Warwick's superior social standing, as the Prince acquired the Countess as his own semi-official mistress. The Prince hoped to convince Lady Charles to give up the letter for its destruction, but she gave Lady Warwick an ultimatum: stay away from London that season and the letter would be returned. Lady Warwick refused, and the Prince of Wales made the situation worse by hinting to Lady Charles that the position she and her husband held in society would be endangered. This angered Lord Charles enough to push the Prince of Wales against a sofa. The Prince forgave Lord Charles for his actions, but the scandal placed a strain on the friendship of the two men. The quarrel lasted until Prime Minister Lord Salisbury intervened and both parties reached an agreement. Nevertheless, the relations between Edward VII and Lord Charles remained weak for the remainder of their lives.

For almost a decade Daisy was a special favourite of the Prince of Wales. She nevertheless formed her own passionate attachments elsewhere. She fell hopelessly in love with a faithless millionaire bachelor, Joseph Laycock. When she became pregnant with Laycock's child, the Prince of Wales, although still fond of her, insisted that a distance be kept between them. However, Laycock was also in an affair with Kitty, the Marchioness of Downshire. When the Marquess of Downshire threatened divorce over her affair, this menage-à-trois set society's pens ablaze with letters deploring, snickering at and gossiping about such scandalous conduct. Laycock married Lady Downshire after her divorce.

At this time Daisy threw herself into the schemes which she had begun to address social inequality, including the education and feeding of the children of the poor and the education and employment of women. She formally joined the Social Democratic Federation and campaigned in support of candidates from both the SDF and the Independent Labour Party. Nevertheless, her lifestyle, largesse in community projects and years of lavish entertainment and socialite pursuits had depleted the immense fortune she had inherited from her grandfather.

Later life

Following the death of Edward VII, and having found herself facing increasingly large debts as a result of her unmanaged philanthropy and carelessness in money matters, an attempt was made to secure the private sale of the late King's letters to Daisy to the new King George V. The letters demonstrated the extent of Edward VII's infidelities and would have scandalised society if they had been made public. It was on the intervention of Lord Stamfordham that the scheme was halted as he argued their copyright belonged to the King. After the High Court restrained her from publishing the letters in Britain, she threatened to sell them to the American media. British industrialist and politician Arthur Du Cros offered to pay £64,000 worth of Daisy's debts in return for the love letters and, for his generosity, he was created a baronet in 1916.

In 1928, Daisy was facing imprisonment in HM Prison Holloway for her debts but was released on condition that if and when she published her memoirs she would "undertake to submit it to a literary man". When her memoir manuscript was eventually submitted, it was censored, but Daisy's daughter still called it so vulgar that it could only be described as "muck". Titled "Life's Ebb and Flow," today it is considered one of the best-written memoirs on Edwardian society and is often cited. Copies of the love letters were later released to the public by Daisy's daughter; rather than being the passionate love letters claimed by Daisy, they were found to be a mix of gossip and "affectionate banter".

Politics and philanthropy 

Robert Blatchford wrote a critique of Lady Warwick's lifestyle in the 1890s, and this led her to seek him out to discuss socialism. His lengthy and reasoned riposte to her had a lasting impact and from then on, she determinedly sought to find out more about the lives of the poor. She joined the Social Democratic Federation in 1904. She donated large amounts of money to the organisation and in particular supported its campaign for free meals for schoolchildren alongside her secretary Mary Bridges-Adams. As a patron of several parishes, she presented socialist clergy including Conrad Noel to their livings despite the controversy caused. As a socialist, she opposed World War I as a "capitalist imposition" and supported the October Revolution. After the war, she joined the Independent Labour Party. She stood as Independent Labour Party candidate in 1923 for the Warwick and Leamington constituency against Anthony Eden who was the eventual winner.

Lady Warwick founded a secondary and technical science school and school of agriculture at Bigods, Dunmow, near to her Essex property Easton Lodge. Her intention in creating the school was to encourage the development of intelligent workers who could make use of their skills to develop British agriculture. She perceived British agricultural workers to be poorly educated and inferior to those in continental Europe. The school ran for roughly 10 years with financial support from her between 1897 and 1907. She founded a needlework school at Easton for girls whom she recognised had excellent hand skills that would enable them to gain meaningful and well-paid employment. She set up a hostel for women students of agriculture at Reading, which was succeeded after six years by a bigger all-inclusive college, land and accommodation scheme at Studley Castle and park, Studley Agricultural College for Women. She wanted to gift Easton to the Independent Labour Party and then to the TUC as a college for socialism, but neither scheme progressed beyond initial acceptances that led to the holding of the ILP's annual summer school in August 1925 and a series of weekend conferences over the same summer. She created and extended the gardens both at Warwick Castle and at Easton Lodge and was President of the National Chrysanthemum Society.  She commissioned Harold Peto to create gardens over 10 acres of the parkland at Easton which included creating a sunken garden, a lily canal, and a rose arbour, all laid out in an Italianate style. The scheme was put into effect through the labour of men from the Salvation Army Colony at Hadleigh. She kept a menagerie of birds and animals at Easton, and a set of former circus ponies at Warwick Castle; amongst the creatures kept was a famous white peacock. The novelist H. G. Wells was a resident of her Easton estate, leasing Easton Glebe from 1910 to 1928.

She threw parties to raise funds to provide the chapel which is now a part of Warwick Boys' School with a pulpit, known as "Daisy's Pulpit".

During the 1890s, Lady Warwick became acquainted with the novelist Elinor Glyn, whom she introduced into British society.

From 1912 Daisy began acting as leader and hostess of the 'Warwick Circle' at Easton Lodge, often based around select garden parties and largely dedicated to a reinvention of supposed folk traditions, pageants, dances and dialect plays, under the banner of the Dunmow and District Progressive Club, with newly written 'vernacular' plays performed at Lady Warwick's Barn Theatre at Little Easton. The purpose of the enterprise was the enlightenment of the local lower classes. Daisy commented on the coming endeavour in a 1911 letter to R. D. Blumenfeld with: "We shall be a little group of the Salt of the Earth in the Dunmow District soon!" Conrad Noel, the 'Red Vicar' of Thaxted, whom Daisy had appointed to his incumbency, was a critical supporter stating that this "...smacked of [the] Bloomsbury" set. Members of Cecil Sharp's English Folk Dance Society performed at the inaugural event at The Barn Theatre and Sharp noted that Daisy's vote of thanks contained a vision of "merry dancers on village greens and the people of Easton dancing to meet the people of Dunmow". Those who contributed and gravitated to be entertained in the 'Warwick Circle' were fellow socialist political proponents and literary figures, including H. G. Wells, Lancelot and Hugh Cranmer-Byng (playwrights and scions of the Torrington baronetcy), Samuel Levy Bensusan (dialect playwright and writer), Ramsay MacDonald, J. W. Robertson Scott, Howell Arthur Gwynne, Sir Walter Gilbey, Henry De Vere Stacpoole, J. M. Barrie, George Bernard Shaw, Cecil Sharp, Arnold Bennett and Harold Monro (poet).

Cultural Depictions
Actress Virginia McKenna portrayed Daisy Greville in the 1972-1973 miniseries The Edwardians.
Carolyn Seymour portrayed Greville in the 1975 miniseries Edward the Seventh.

References

Bibliography
Anand, Sushila (2008), Daisy: The Life and Loves of the Countess of Warwick, Piatkus. 
Lang, Theo. (1966). My Darling Daisy. London: Michael Joseph
Blunden, Margaret. (1967). The Countess of Warwick. London: Cassell & Co
Warwick, Frances, Countess of. (1929). Life's Ebb and Flow. New York: William Morrow & Company
Warwick, Frances, Countess of. (1931). Discretions. New York: Charles Scribner's Sons

External links

 
 
A Countess and her Castle: Warwick Castle in 1900
A life in contrast: Daisy, Countess of Warwick By Daisy's biographer Victoria Fishburn

Warwick, Daisy Greville, Countess of
Warwick, Daisy Greville, Countess of
British socialites
Mistresses of Edward VII
Warwick, Daisy Greville, Countess of
Social Democratic Federation members
Women of the Victorian era
British philanthropists
Daisy
People from Great Dunmow
Labour Party (UK) parliamentary candidates